The Stewart County Courthouse, in Lumpkin, Georgia is a historic courthouse built in 1923 for Stewart County, Georgia.  It was listed on the National Register of Historic Places in 1980.

It was built to replace the previous courthouse, built in 1895, which was burned in 1922. It is a two-story brick Classical Revival-style courthouse. Its front and rear facades have identical projecting pedimented porticoes with four Tuscan columns. The building's original cupola and clocktower have been lost. It is at the center of the Lumpkin Commercial Historic District.

References

External links

National Register of Historic Places in Stewart County, Georgia
Courthouses in Georgia (U.S. state)
Neoclassical architecture in Georgia (U.S. state)
Buildings and structures completed in 1923
1923 establishments in Georgia (U.S. state)